Emmett "Bud" Etzold is an American football coach.  He served as the head football coach at Jamestown College from 1995 to 1999 and again from 2008 to 2011, compiling a record of 43–45.

Head coaching record

References
	

Year of birth missing (living people)
Living people
Central Michigan Chippewas football coaches
Central Missouri Mules football coaches
Dickinson State Blue Hawks football coaches
Jamestown Jimmies athletic directors
Jamestown Jimmies football coaches
Mary Marauders football coaches
North Dakota Fighting Hawks football coaches
University of Central Missouri alumni